Hanan Issa (born 1986/1987) is a Welsh-Iraqi poet, film-maker, scriptwriter and artist. She is the current National Poet of Wales.

Biography 
Issa grew up in Cardiff, Wales. Her first solo publication was My Body Can House Two Hearts, a pamphlet of poetry published by Burning Eye Books in 2019. The pamphlet was one of three to win Burning Eye's debut pamphlet competition.

During her writing career, Issa has also worked a film-maker and scriptwriter. In 2017, her winning monologue 'With Her Back Straight' was performed at the Bush Theatre as part of the Hijabi Monologues project. In 2020, Issa was the recipient of a Ffilm Cymru/BBC Wales commission, which resulted in her writing and directing the short film The Golden Apple (2022). She worked on the Channel 4 comedy series We Are Lady Parts, working alongside the show's creator Nida Manzoor.

Alongside Darren Chetty, Grug Muse and Iestyn Tyne, Issa acted as a contributing editor to the essay anthology Welsh (Plural): Essays on the Future of Wales, published by Repeater Books in 2022. with Issa noted that "connections between one loyalty and another flow as easily for me as one body of water running into another." Issa also co-edited (with Durre Shahwar and Özgür Uyanık) the essay anthology Just So You Know: Essays of Experience, published by Parthian Books in 2020.

In July 2022, Issa was appointed as the National Poet of Wales, succeeding Ifor ap Glyn. The announcement was made on 6 July on BBC Radio 4's Front Row, with presenter Samira Ahmed interviewing Issa following the announcement. Following an extensive selection process, Issa was appointed for a period of three years, with her tenure set to run until 2025. She became the first Muslim poet to hold the title.

Publications

Poetry 
 My Body Can House Two Hearts (2019)

As editor 
 Just So You Know: Essays of Experience (2020)
 Welsh (Plural): Essays on the Future of Wales (2022)

References

1980s births
Living people
Welsh poets